Lo Romántico de Los Bukis  ("The Romantic of Los Bukis") is a compilation album released by Mexican band Los Bukis in 1989.

Track listing

References

External links
Fan website
 Lo Romántico de Los Bukis on amazon.com
[] Lo Romántico de Los Bukis on allmusic.com

Los Bukis compilation albums
Fonovisa Records compilation albums
1989 compilation albums